Yves Blondeau (born 29 April 1951) is a French skier. He competed at the 1976 Winter Olympics and the 1980 Winter Olympics.

References

External links
 

1951 births
Living people
French male biathletes
French male cross-country skiers
Olympic biathletes of France
Olympic cross-country skiers of France
Biathletes at the 1980 Winter Olympics
Cross-country skiers at the 1976 Winter Olympics
Place of birth missing (living people)
20th-century French people